This is a list of notable alumni who have attended or graduated The Judge Advocate General's Legal Center and School. The JAG School is generally considered the most exclusive graduate service academy within the U.S. Federal Government. It is considered "highly selective" with an acceptance rate ranging between 4 and 7%. In 2017, the Army JAG Corps and subsequent JAG School only accepted 200 of 4,000 applicants. The JAG School has a long history of supplying attorneys into the military and federal government roles, particularly the federal judiciary.

Law and politics

United States government

Executive branch

Executive council members
J. Reuben Clark, Under Secretary of State
Fred Dutton, Assistant Secretary of State
Judd H. Lyons, Assistant Secretary of Defense
Robert C. O'Brien, 28th U.S. National Security Advisor

U.S. attorneys
John L. Brownlee, United States Attorney for Western District of Virginia
Frank DeArmon Whitney, United States Attorney for the Eastern District of North Carolina
Maria Chapa Lopez, United States Attorney for the Middle District of Florida
David C. Joseph, United States Attorney for the Western District of Louisiana
Kenneth John Gonzales, United States Attorney for the District of New Mexico
Ira K. Wells, United States Attorney for the District of Puerto Rico
Bobby Christine, United States Attorney for the Southern District of Georgia
Duane Kees, United States Attorney for the Western District of Arkansas
Grant C. Jaquith, United States Attorney for the Northern District of New York
Kasey Warner, United States Attorney for the Southern District of West Virginia

U.S. diplomatic figures
John Bingham, United States Ambassador to Japan
Ralph Elihu Becker, United States Ambassador to Honduras
Scott Brown, United States Ambassador to New Zealand & Samoa
J. Reuben Clark, United States Ambassador to Mexico
Russell F. Freeman, United States Ambassador to Belize

Legislative branch (U.S. Congress)

House
William Vollie Alexander Jr., U.S. Representative from Arkansas
Syd Herlong, U.S. Representative from Florida
Greg Steube, U.S. Representative from Florida
John A. T. Hull, U.S. Representative from Iowa
Steve Buyer, U.S. Representative from Indiana 
Goodloe Byron, U.S. Representative from Maryland
Anthony Brown, U.S. Representative from Maryland
Elmer Ryan, U.S. Representative from Minnesota
Webb Franklin, U.S. Representative from Mississippi 
Mark Amodei, U.S. Representative from Nevada
John Laurance, U.S. Representative from New York
Martin B. McKneally, U.S. Representative from New York
Lee Zeldin, U.S. Representative from New York
Alexander Pirnie, U.S. Representative from New York
Gregory W. Carman, U.S. Representative from New York
John H. Ray, U.S. Representative from New York
George H. Wilson, U.S. Representative from Oklahoma 
Patrick Murphy, U.S. Representative from Pennsylvania
Joe L. Evins, U.S. Representative from Tennessee 
Louie Gohmert, U.S. Representative from Texas

Senate
J. Bennett Johnston, U.S. Senator from Louisiana
Dennis DeConcini, U.S. Senator from Arizona
Frank Moss, U.S. Senator from Utah
George B. Martin, U.S. Senator from Kentucky
Scott Brown, U.S. Senator from Massachusetts

Judicial branch

Federal appellate judges
G. Steven Agee, Judge of the United States Court of Appeals for the Fourth Circuit
Roger Miner, Judge of United States Court of Appeals for the Fourth Circuit
Leslie H. Southwick, Judge of United States Court of Appeals for the Fourth Circuit
Carl E. Stewart, Chief Judge of United States Court of Appeals for the Fourth Circuit
William Lockhart Garwood, Judge of the United States Court of Appeals for the Fifth Circuit
John Weld Peck II, Judge of the United States Court of Appeals for the Sixth Circuit
Pasco Bowman II, Chief Judge of the United States Court of Appeals for the Eighth Circuit
David R. Hansen, Chief Judge of the United States Court of Appeals for the Eighth Circuit
Evan Wallach, Judge of United States Court of Appeals for the Federal Circuit
Herbert Choy, Judge of the United States Court of Appeals for the Ninth Circuit
Gregory W. Carman, Chief Judge of the United States Court of International Trade

Federal district court judges
Liles C. Burke, Judge of the United States District Court for the Northern District of Alabama
L. Scott Coogler, Chief Judge of the United States District Court for the Northern District of Alabama
Douglas L. Rayes, Judge of the United States District Court for the District of Arizona
Morrison C. England Jr., Chief Judge of the United States District Court for the Eastern District of California
James M. Ideman, Judge of the United States District Court for the Central District of California
Gary L. Taylor, Judge of the United States District Court for the Central District of California
Royce Lamberth, Chief Judge, United States District Court for the District of Columbia
Donald L. Graham, Judge of United States District Court for the Southern District of Florida
Winston Arnow Chief Judge of the United States District Court for the Northern District of Florida
Howell W. Melton, Judge of the United States District Court for the Middle District of Florida
J. P. Boulee, Judge United States District Court for the Northern District of Georgia
Charles A. Pannell Jr., Judge of the United States District Court for the Northern District of Georgia
Derrick Watson, Judge of the United States District Court for the District of Hawaii
Dee D. Drell, Chief Judge of United States District Court for the Western District of Louisiana 
David C. Joseph, Judge of the United States District Court for the Western District of Louisiana
Frederic N. Smalkin, Chief Judge of the United States District Court for the District of Maryland
Edward L. Leahy Judge of United States District Court for the New Hampshire
Steven J. McAuliffe, Chief Judge of the United States District Court for the District of New Hampshire
John Laurance, Judge of United States District Court for the District of New York
Kenneth John Gonzales, Judge of the United States District Court for the District of New Mexico
Frank DeArmon Whitney, Chief Judge of the United States District Court for the Western District of North Carolina
David Dudley Dowd Jr., Judge of the United States District Court for the Northern District of Ohio
William Huntington Kirkpatrick, Judge United States District Court for the Eastern District of Pennsylvania 
Edmund V. Ludwig, Judge of the United States District Court for the Eastern District of Pennsylvania
Kim R. Gibson, Judge of the United States District Court for the Western District of Pennsylvania
Jose Victor Toledo, Judge of the United States District Court for the District of Puerto Rico
Ira K. Wells, Judge of United States District Court for the District Puerto Rico
Andrew Wendell Bogue, Chief Judge of the United States District Court for the District of South Dakota
Lawrence L. Piersol, Chief Judge of the United States District Court for the District of South Dakota
Robert J. O'Conor Jr., Judge of the United States District Court for the Southern District of Texas
Sim Lake, Judge of the United States District Court for the Southern District of Texas
James R. Spencer, Judge of the United States District Court for the Eastern District of Virginia.

State government
Marc Racicot Governor of Montana
Blanton Winship, Governor of Puerto Rico
Mike Stack, Lieutenant Governor of Pennsylvania 
Bob McDonnell, Governor of Virginia
Anthony Brown, Lieutenant Governor of Maryland
Ron DeSantis, Governor of Florida

Attorneys general
Marc Racicot, Attorney General of Montana
Carl Danberg, Attorney General of Delaware
Beau Biden, Attorney General of Delaware and son of President Joe Biden.
Bob McDonnell, Attorney General of Virginia
Grenville Beardsley, Attorney General of Illinois
Mark Brnovich, Attorney General of Arizona

State judiciary
Arno H. Denecke, Chief Justice of Oregon Supreme Court
Frank LaBuda, Associate Justice of New York Supreme Court
John A. Hull, Associate Justice of the Supreme Court of the Philippines
J. Philip Johnson, Associate Justice North Dakota Supreme Court
Price Daniel, Associate Justice of the Texas Supreme Court
N. Patrick Crooks, Associate Justice of the Wisconsin Supreme Court
Robert E. Davis,  Chief Justice of the Kansas Supreme Court
Herbert R. Brown, Associate Justice of the Ohio Supreme Court
A. William Sweeney, Associate Justice of the Ohio Supreme Court
Charles B. Zimmerman, Associate Justice of the Ohio Supreme Court
Josephine L. Hart, Associate Justice of the Arkansas Supreme Court
Joseph T. Walsh, Associate Justice of Delaware Supreme Court
N. Patrick Crooks, Associate Justice of Wisconsin Supreme Court
Paul A. Chase, Associate Justice of the Vermont Supreme Court
Rudolph J. Daley, Associate Justice of the Vermont Supreme Court
William C. Hill, Associate Justice of the Vermont Supreme Court
Ernest W. Gibson III, Associate Justice of the Vermont Supreme Court
Jerod E. Tufte, Associate Justice of the North Dakota Supreme Court

Non U.S. political figures
Richard Reeve Baxter, Judge of the International Court of Justice
Amnon Straschnov, Military Advocate General of the Israeli Defense Forces

Other military figures
Robyn J. Blader, U.S. National Guard general
Dana K. Chipman, Judge Advocate General of the United States Army
Caroline A. Crenshaw, Commissioner of the U.S. Securities and Exchange Commission.
Flora D. Darpino, first woman Judge Advocate General of the United States Army
Moe Davis, Air Force colonel 
Andrew S. Effron, chief judge of the United States Court of Appeals for the Armed Forces
David Jonas, United States government official, nominee for General Counsel of the United States Department of Energy
James E. McPherson, Judge Advocate General of the United States Navy, executive director of the National Association of Attorneys General
Grier Martin, State Representative (D-North Carolina)
Mark S. Martins, chief prosecutor in the trial of Khalid Sheik Mohammed
Hubert Miller, Olympic bobsledder 
Haldane Robert Mayer, United States federal appellate judge (Court of Appeals for the Federal Circuit)
Lisa M. Schenck, professor, George Washington University Law School
William K. Suter, 19th Clerk of the Supreme Court of the United States

References

Judge Advocate General's Legal Center and School